Gannes is a genus of beetles in the family Laemophloeidae, containing the following species:

 Gannes ambiguus Grouvelle
 Gannes immoderatus Lefkovitch

References

Laemophloeidae
Cucujoidea genera